Palustriella is a genus of mosses belonging to the family Amblystegiaceae.

The species of this genus are found in Eurasia and Northern America.

Species:
 Palustriella commutata Ochyra, 1989
 Palustriella decipiens Ochyra, 1989

References

Amblystegiaceae
Moss genera